Gayle Cook (née Karch, born March 1, 1934) is an American businesswoman who in 1963 co-founded the Cook Group, a medical equipment manufacturing company, with her husband William Cook. In 2014, her net worth was estimated at US$5.8 billion.

Early life
Gayle Karch was born on March 1, 1934, in Evansville, Indiana, the daughter of Arthur and Thelma Karch. She graduated Phi Beta Kappa from Indiana University in 1956 with a Bachelor of Arts degree in Fine Arts.

Career
In 1963, she and her husband William Cook co-founded the Cook Group, a medical equipment manufacturer. , she still served on the company's board of directors.

According to Forbes, she had a net worth of $5.8 billion in 2014, up from $5.2 billion in 2013, placing her at #85 on the Forbes 400 for the year.

Philanthropy
Cook has made charitable contributions to her alma mater, Indiana University, and serves on the board of the Indiana University Foundation. She received the Gertrude Rich Award in 1983 an honorary Doctor of Humane Letters in 1993, both from Indiana University.

She and her husband have funded the restoration of many historic buildings, mainly in southern Indiana, including 40 that appear on the National Register of Historic Places. She is a co-founder of the Monroe County Historical Society Museum, a member of the Historic Landmarks Foundation of Indiana, and a Landmark member of The Nature Conservancy.

Personal life
Gayle Cook was married to William Cook from 1957 until his death in 2011. Their son, Carl Cook, succeeded William as CEO upon the latter's death. She also has a granddaughter. She has coauthored two books on local landmarks, A Guide to Southern Indiana (1972, with William Cook) and Monroe County in Focus (1990, with Diana Hawes and Will Counts).

Bibliography
A Guide to Southern Indiana (with William Cook, Owen Litho Service, 1972).
Monroe County in Focus: Portrait of an Indiana County (with Diana Hawes and Will Counts, Discovery Press, 1990).

References

Living people
People from Bloomington, Indiana
Indiana University Bloomington alumni
American billionaires
Female billionaires
1934 births